The 2014 Grand Canyon Antelopes baseball team represented Grand Canyon University in the 2014 NCAA Division I baseball season.  The 'Lopes played their home games at Brazell Stadium and were first-year members of the Western Athletic Conference.  The team was coached by Andy Stankiewicz in his 3rd season at Grand Canyon.

Previous season
The 'Lopes were coming off of a 40–19 overall record and a 26–10 conference record, competing in the Division II PacWest Conference, where they were crowned Co-Conference Champions.  Grand Canyon advanced to the NCAA Division II Baseball Championship where they went 1–2, eventually being eliminated with a loss to St. Edward's University.

Roster

Coaches

Schedule

! style="background:#522D80; border: 2px solid #FFFFFF;color:white;"| Regular Season
|- valign="top" 

|- align="center" bgcolor="#ffbbb"
| Feb 14 || @ Louisiana-Monroe || Warhawk Field • Monroe, LA  || 3-6 || 877 || 0–1 || –
|- align="center" bgcolor="#ffbbb"
| Feb 15 || @ Louisiana-Monroe || Warhawk Field • Monroe, LA || 4–5 || 864 || 0–2 || –
|- align="center" bgcolor="#ccffcc"
| Feb 16 || @ Louisiana-Monroe || Warhawk Field • Monroe, LA || 7–1 || 764 || 1-2 || –
|- align="center" bgcolor="#ffbbb"
| Feb 18 || @  || Pete Beiden Field • Fresno, CA || 1-10 || 1,261 || 1–3 || –
|- align="center" bgcolor="#ccffcc"
| Feb 21 || vs  || Brazell Stadium • Phoenix, AZ || 8-1 || 612 || 2–3 || –
|- align="center" bgcolor="ccffcc"
| Feb 22 || vs Hofstra || Brazell Stadium • Phoenix, AZ || 10-3 || 205 || 3-3 || -
|- align="center" bgcolor="ffbbb"
| Feb 22 || vs Hofstra || Brazell Stadium • Phoenix, AZ || 5-7 || 171 || 3-4 || -
|- align="center" bgcolor="ccffcc"
| Feb 23 || vs Hofstra || Brazell Stadium • Phoenix, AZ || 9-2 || 192 || 4-4 || 
|- align="center" bgcolor="ffbbb"
| Feb 28 || vs  || Crutcher Scott Field • Abilene, TX || 4-9 || 228 || 4-5 || -
|-

|- align="center" bgcolor="ffbbb"
| Mar 1 || vs  || Crutcher Scott Field • Abilene, TX || 1-11 || 225 || 4-6 || -
|- align="center" bgcolor="ffbbb"
| Mar 1 || @ Abilene Christian || Crutcher Scott Field • Abilene, TX || 2-3 (10) || 751 || 4-7 || -
|- align="center" bgcolor="ffbbb"
| Mar 7 || vs  || Brazell Stadium • Phoenix, AZ || 0-6 || 204 || 4-8 || -
|- align="center" bgcolor="ccffcc"
| Mar 8 || vs Nebraska-Omaha || Brazell Stadium • Phoenix, AZ || 9-2 || 191 || 5-8 || -
|- align="center" bgcolor="ccffcc"
| Mar 8 || vs Nebraska-Omaha || Brazell Stadium • Phoenix, AZ || 14-0 (7) || 122 || 6-8 || -
|- align="center" bgcolor="ccffcc"
| Mar 9 || vs Nebraska-Omaha || Brazell Stadium • Phoenix, AZ || 5-2 || 211 || 7-8 || -
|- align="center" bgcolor=""
| Mar 14 || @  || Hardt Field • Bakersfield, CA ||  ||  ||  || 
|- align="center" bgcolor=""
| Mar 15 || @ Bakersfield || Hardt Field • Bakersfield, CA ||  ||  ||  || 
|- align="center" bgcolor=""
| Mar 16 || @ Bakersfield || Hardt Field • Bakersfield, CA ||  ||  ||  || 
|- align="center" bgcolor=""
| Mar 18 || @ Arizona || Hi Corbett Field • Tucson, AZ ||  ||  ||  || 
|- align="center" bgcolor=""
| Mar 21 || vs UC Irvine || Cicerone Field • Irvine, CA ||  ||  ||  || 
|- align="center" bgcolor=""
| Mar 22 || vs UC Irvine || Cicerone Field • Irvine, CA ||  ||  ||  || 
|- align="center" bgcolor=""
| Mar 23 || vs UC Irvine || Cicerone Field • Irvine, CA ||  ||  ||  || 
|- align="center" bgcolor=""
| Mar 28 || vs  || Brazell Stadium • Phoenix, AZ ||  ||  ||  || 
|- align="center" bgcolor=""
| Mar 29 || vs Chicago State || Brazell Stadium • Phoenix, AZ ||  ||  ||  || 
|- align="center" bgcolor=""
| Mar 30 || vs Chicago State || Brazell Stadium • Phoenix, AZ ||  ||  ||  || 
|- align="center" bgcolor=""
| Mar 31 || @  || William Peccole Park • Reno, NV ||  ||  ||  || 
|-
| colspan=7 style="text-align:left" | 
|-

|- align="center" bgcolor=""
| Apr 1 || @  || William Peccole Park • Reno, NV ||  ||  ||  || 
|- align="center" bgcolor=""
| Apr 4 || @  || Edinburg Stadium • Edinburg, TX ||  ||  ||  || 
|- align="center" bgcolor=""
| Apr 5 || @ Texas-Pan American || Edinburg Stadium • Edinburg, TX ||  ||  ||  || 
|- align="center" bgcolor=""
| Apr 6 || @ Texas-Pan American || Edinburg Stadium • Edinburg, TX ||  ||  ||  || 
|- align="center" bgcolor=""
| Apr 11 || vs  || Brazell Stadium • Phoenix, AZ ||  ||  ||  || 
|- align="center" bgcolor=""
| Apr 12 || vs Sacramento State || Brazell Stadium • Phoenix, AZ ||  ||  ||  || 
|- align="center" bgcolor=""
| Apr 13 || vs Sacramento State || Brazell Stadium • Phoenix, AZ ||  ||  ||  || 
|- align="center" bgcolor=""
| Apr 15 || @  || Hoglund Ballpark • Lawrence, KS ||  ||  ||  || 
|- align="center" bgcolor=""
| Apr 16 || @ Kansas || Hoglund Ballpark • Lawrence, KS ||  ||  ||  || 
|- align="center" bgcolor=""
| Apr 18 || @  || Jackson Field • Greeley, CO ||  ||  ||  || 
|- align="center" bgcolor=""
| Apr 19 || @ Northern Colorado || Jackson Field • Greeley, CO ||  ||  ||  || 
|- align="center" bgcolor=""
| Apr 20 || @ Northern Colorado || Jackson Field • Greeley, CO ||  ||  ||  || 
|- align="center" bgcolor=""
| Apr 25 || vs  || Brazell Stadium • Phoenix, AZ ||  ||  ||  || 
|- align="center" bgcolor=""
| Apr 26 || vs New Mexico State || Brazell Stadium • Phoenix, AZ ||  ||  ||  || 
|- align="center" bgcolor=""
| Apr 27 || vs New Mexico State || Brazell Stadium • Phoenix, AZ ||  ||  ||  || 
|-

|- align="center" bgcolor=""
| May 2 || @  || Bannerwood Park • Bellevue, WA ||  ||  ||  || 
|- align="center" bgcolor=""
| May 3 || @ Seattle U || Bannerwood Park • Bellevue, WA ||  ||  ||  || 
|- align="center" bgcolor=""
| May 4 || @ Seattle U || Bannerwood Park • Bellevue, WA ||  ||  ||  || 
|- align="center" bgcolor=""
| May 5 || @  || Husky Ballpark • Seattle, WA ||  ||  ||  || 
|- align="center" bgcolor=""
| May 9 || @  || Harold Kraft Memorial Field • Grand Forks, ND ||  ||  ||  || 
|- align="center" bgcolor=""
| May 10 || @ North Dakota || Harold Kraft Memorial Field • Grand Forks, ND ||  ||  ||  || 
|- align="center" bgcolor=""
| May 11 || @ North Dakota || Harold Kraft Memorial Field • Grand Forks, ND ||  ||  ||  ||  
|- align="center" bgcolor=""
| May 16 || vs  || Brazell Stadium • Phoenix, AZ ||  ||  ||  || 
|- align="center" bgcolor=""
| May 17 || vs Utah Valley || Brazell Stadium • Phoenix, AZ ||  ||  ||  || 
|- align="center" bgcolor=""
| May 18 || vs Utah Valley || Brazell Stadium • Phoenix, AZ ||  ||  ||  || 
|- align="center" bgcolor=""
| May 19 || @  || Dedeaux Field • Los Angeles, CA ||  ||  ||  || 
|- align="center" bgcolor="" 
| May 20 || @  || Riverside Sports Complex • Riverside, CA ||  ||  ||  || 
|-

References 

Grand Canyon Antelopes baseball seasons
Grand Canyon
Grand Canyon Antelopes baseball team